The following is a list of New Zealand designers and craftspeople.

 Frank Carpay (1917-1985) - ceramicist and textile designer
 Len Castle (1924-2011) - ceramicist
 Trelise Cooper - fashion designer
 Elisabeth Findlay (born 1948) - fashion designer
 Clifton Firth (1904-1980) - graphic designer 
 Roderick Fry (born 1969) - furniture designer 
 Humphrey Ikin (born 1957) - furniture designer
 Flora MacKenzie (1902-1982) - dressmaker
 Keith Murray (1892-1981) - ceramicist
 Anton Seuffert (1815-1887) - 19th-century furniture maker
 Ernest Shufflebotham (1908-1984) - ceramicist
 May Smith (1906-1988) - fabric designer
 Rebecca Taylor (born 1969) - fashion designer (moved to United States)
 David Trubridge - furniture and lighting designer
 Karen Walker (born 1969) - fashion designer

New Zealand
Designers